Richard Stobo (born 20 June 1965) is an Australian cricketer. He played six first-class and two List A matches for New South Wales between 1988/89 and 1992/93.

See also
 List of New South Wales representative cricketers

References

External links
 

1965 births
Living people
Australian cricketers
New South Wales cricketers
Cricketers from Toowoomba